The Bagotville is a tugboat built in Quebec in 1964.

The Bagotville was one of the tugs that helped install the pipes for Toronto's deep lake water cooling project.

The Bagotville was one of the tugs that attempted to free the lake freighter George M. Carl, when she ran aground off the Humber River, in October 1975.

References

Tugboats of Canada
Tugboats on the Great Lakes
1964 ships
Ships built in Quebec